Stephen Davies (born July 21, 1959) is a former professional rugby league footballer who played in the 1970s and 1980s. He played at club level for both the Parramatta Eels and Penrith Panthers (Heritage No. 230)

Playing career

Davies played , number 2. He made his debut in 1976 with Terry Fernley's Parramatta side whilst playing school boy football with Ashcroft High School. Stephen scored 44 tries that season as a sixteen year old.

Coaching career
Stephen Davies coached a successful, all conquering Ashcroft High School side from 1978 - 1985.

References

1959 births
Living people
Australian rugby league players
Parramatta Eels players
Penrith Panthers players
Rugby league centres
Rugby league players from Campsie, New South Wales
Rugby league wingers